AC-T may refer to:

Adriamycin, cyclophosphamide, and a taxane, a combination chemotherapy regimen used to treat breast cancer
Asheville Citizen-Times, a newspaper based in Asheville, North Carolina
Albert City–Truesdale Community School District, a school district in Iowa